The Criminal Code is a law that codifies most criminal offences and procedures in Canada. Its official long title is An Act respecting the Criminal Law, and it is sometimes abbreviated as Cr.C. in legal reports. Section 91(27) of the Constitution Act, 1867 establishes the sole jurisdiction of the Parliament of Canada over criminal law.

The Criminal Code contains some defences, but most are part of the common law rather than statute. Important Canadian criminal laws not forming part of the code include the Firearms Act, the Controlled Drugs and Substances Act, the Canada Evidence Act, the Food and Drugs Act, the Youth Criminal Justice Act and the Contraventions Act.

One of the conveniences of the Criminal Code was that it constituted the principle that no person would be able to be convicted of a crime unless otherwise specifically outlined and stated in a statute. This legal document has played a major part in Canada's history and has also helped form other legal acts and laws, for example, the Controlled Drugs and Substances Act.

Structure

Part I — General
Part II — Offences Against Public Order
Part II.1 — Terrorism
Part III — Firearms and Other Weapons
Part IV — Offences Against the Administration of Law and Justice
Part V — Sexual Offences, Public Morals and Disorderly Conduct
Part VI — Invasion of Privacy
Part VII — Disorderly Houses, Gaming and Betting
Part VIII — Offences Against the Person and Reputation
Part VIII.1 — Offences Relating to Conveyances
Part IX — Offences Against Rights of Property
Part X — Fraudulent Transactions Relating to Contracts and Trade
Part XI — Wilful and Forbidden Acts in Respect of Certain Property
Part XII — Offences Relating to Currency
Part XII.1 — Instruments and Literature for Illicit Drug Use (repealed)
Part XII.2 — Proceeds of Crime
Part XIII — Attempts — Conspiracies — Accessories
Part XIV — Jurisdiction
Part XV — Special Procedure and Powers
Part XVI — Compelling Appearance of an Accused Before a Justice and Interim Release
Part XVII — Language of Accused
Part XVIII — Procedure on Preliminary Inquiry
Part XVIII.1 — Case Management Judge
Part XIX — Indictable Offences — Trial Without Jury
Part XIX.1 — Nunavut Court of Justice
Part XX — Procedure in Jury Trials and General Provisions
Part XX.1 — Mental Disorder
Part XXI — Appeals — Indictable Offences
Part XXI.1 — Applications for Ministerial Review — Miscarriages of Justice
Part XXII — Procuring Attendance
Part XXII.01 — Remote Attendance by Certain Persons
Part XXII.1 — Remediation Agreements
Part XXIII — Sentencing
Part XXIV — Dangerous Offenders and Long-term Offenders
Part XXV — Effect and Enforcement of Undertakings, Release Orders and Recognizances
Part XXVI — Extraordinary Remedies
Part XXVII — Summary Convictions
Part XXVIII — Miscellaneous

History and evolution
The Criminal Code stems from a long history of legal documents. The following documents play a part in the construction and changes brought on the Criminal Code:

See also
 Criminal law in Canada
 Section 98

Notes

References

External links
Criminal Code (Department of Justice, Canada)
Criminal Code at The Canadian Encyclopedia
Canadian Legal Information Institute contains the CCoC in a searchable database.

Criminal codes
Canadian federal legislation
1892 in Canadian law
Legal history of Canada
Canadian criminal law